Sao Nang Hearn Kham (26 May 1916 – 17 January 2003) was the Mahadevi of Yawnghwe one of the most important Shan States. Her husband Sao Shwe Thaik was the 23d and last Saopha of Yawnghwe and became the first President of Burma and she became the first First Lady of Myanmar. She is an important figure in Shan history and was known as "Rebel Queen" being the leader of the Shan State War Council.

Life
She was born as Hearn Kham on 26 May 1916 in Hsenwi, Northern Shan State, as the daughter of 65th Saopha Khun Hsang Ton Hong of North Hsenwi. Her brother would be the 66th and last Saopha of the state.

Sao Nang Hearn Kham was the first wife of the last ruler of Yawhghwe Saopha Sao Shwe Thaik, who became the first President of Burma and with whom she had eight children. Together with her husband she participated in the 1946–1947 Pang Long Agreement. In post-independence Burma she became an MP for the constituency of Hsenwi between 1956 and 1960 and became known for her active role within the parliament under  the administration of  the prime minister U Nu.

Her husband was arrested in the Burmese coup d'état in March 1962 by the Revolutionary Council headed by General Ne Win and one of her sons, who was 17 at that time, was killed in the military coup, apparently the only casualty on the day of the disturbances. She fled with her family to Thailand in October 1963 after her husband had died in prison in November 1962. While in exile she participated in the independence struggle of the Shan State. In 1964 Sao Nang Hearn Kham, together with her son Chao-Tzang Yawnghwe, helped to form the Shan State War Council (SSWC) and the Shan State Army (SSA), becoming Chairwoman of the SSWC.

Sao Nang Hearn Kham died on 17 January 2003 in exile in Canada at the age of 86. Hso Khan Pha, one of her eight children took up her cause of fighting for the liberation of the Shan people.

See also
North Hsenwi, to which royal family she belonged.
Internal conflict in Burma (section Shan State)

References

1916 births
2003 deaths
Yawnghwe
People from Shan State
Politics of Myanmar
Burmese people of Shan descent